United Talent Agency (UTA) is a global talent agency based in Beverly Hills, California. Established in 1991, it represents artists and other professionals across the entertainment industry. , the company has more than 1,400 global employees. UTA has divisions focused on film, television, music, sports, digital, books, video games, branding and licensing, speaking, marketing, fine arts, news, and broadcasting, among others. The agency also operates the non-profit UTA Foundation.

Corporate overview 
UTA, established in 1991, is a private company representing talent in a variety of industries, including film, television, digital media, publishing, music, and video games. It is one of the largest such agencies in the world, with approximately 300 agents representing actors, directors, producers, recording artists, writers, and other professionals. Its services also include brand management, film financing and packaging, licensing, marketing, strategic management, and venture capital financing for companies. In addition to Beverly Hills, UTA has offices in Atlanta, Chicago, London, Malmö, Miami, Nashville, and New York. UTA has over 1400 employees worldwide.

The company operates as a partnership, co-founded by Jim Berkus, Peter Benedek and  Jeremy Zimmer,  who serves as chief executive officer (CEO). Paul Wachter is board Chairman, David Kramer serves as president and Jay Sures is vice chairman. These executives serve on the board of directors along with Andrew Thau, Rich Paul, Blair Kohan, Matt Rice, Ceci Kurzman, Kasper Knokgaard, Sydney Pardey and Philippe Bouchard.

History

Founding and early history 
United Talent Agency was established in 1991 through the merger of the Bauer-Benedek Agency and Leading Artists Agency. Jim Berkus, Jeremy Zimmer, and Peter Benedek are UTA's co-founders.
 
UTA had 10 partners and 40 agents by mid-1994. The company began compiling a weekly list of mostly entry-level employment opportunities across the entertainment industry, which was described by the Los Angeles Times in 2001 as "among the most coveted documents in wannabe Hollywood". In mid 1996, the company had expanded to 45 agents and was described in the media as one of Hollywood's "big four" agencies.

By the early 2000s, the agency had become known for its roster of comedians including Jim Carrey, Dave Chappelle, Will Ferrell, and Ben Stiller, along with writers for popular comedy television programs. UTA was also known for its television talent, representing clients such as David Chase and Dick Wolf. In 2006, the Los Angeles Times described UTA as a "tastemaker" agency, noting clients such as Don Cheadle, Johnny Depp, and M. Night Shyamalan. The agency established "UTA U" in 2008 to provide skills training to interns by partners and other executives. The program also includes a community service component. UTA was inducted into Vanity Fair's "New Establishment Hall of Fame" in 2010.

Recent history 
In 2011, UTA relocated its headquarters to a Civic Center Drive complex, which was renamed UTA Plaza. The company acquired N.S. Bienstock, one of the largest agencies for television news talent in the United States, in January 2014. N.S. Bienstock represented more than 600 television news anchors, reporters, and producers, including: Glenn Beck, Anderson Cooper, Megyn Kelly, Steve Kroft, Lara Logan, David Muir, Norah O'Donnell, Bill O'Reilly, Robin Roberts, Bob Schieffer, and Bob Simon. Richard Leibner and Carole Cooper continued to serve in their roles as co-presidents of N.S. Bienstock. The merger made UTA the largest company representing television news talent. In 2017, UTA did not renew O'Reilly's contract due to allegations of sexual harassment. The venture was rebranded UTA News & Broadcast in 2017.

The agency created a new publishing imprint called Keywords Press in May 2014, to publish books by internet entertainers. UTA partnered with Atria Publishing Group, a division of Simon & Schuster, to create the imprint. Keywords announced deals with Shane Dawson, Connor Franta, and Joey Graceffa.

In 2015, UTA hired a dozen agents from Creative Artists Agency in what was widely characterized in the media as a "midnight raid". Creative Artists Agency filed a lawsuit in response. Also in that year, the company took a minority investment from Jeffrey W. Ubben, founder and CEO of ValueAct Capital, who became a non-voting UTA board member. ValueAct also was invested in 21st Century Fox, Adobe Systems, CB Richard Ellis, and Microsoft at the time. UTA acquired The Agency Group (TAG), the world's largest independent music agency, in August 2015. TAG had approximately 95 agents working in cities including London, Los Angeles, and New York, and brought around 2,000 artists into UTA's client portfolio, including Muse, Paramore and The Black Keys. UTA expanded its New York City offices in 2016.

In early 2017, UTA held several events relating to political and social movements. In lieu of its annual Academy Awards party, UTA organized a "United Voices" rally outside the company's Beverly Hills headquarters two days before the 89th Academy Awards, in response to President Donald Trump's signing of Executive Order 13769, commonly referred to as the "Muslim travel ban". As many as 2,000 demonstrators attended in support of refugee relief and freedom of speech, including Michael J. Fox, Gavin Newsom, Bill Nye, Wilmer Valderrama, and Kristen Wiig. UTA also contributed $250,000, plus $70,000 collected via crowdfunding, to the American Civil Liberties Union and the International Rescue Committee. The company hosted events for female employees in Los Angeles, New York, and Toronto as part of the Day Without a Woman.

In March 2017, UTA acquired an equity stake in the investment banking firm AGM Partners to give the agency and its clients guidance on investments in the media and entertainment sector. UTA acquired Greater Talent Network (GTN), which focuses on public speaking engagements, in September 2017. Don Epstein, GTN's founder and CEO who represented clients like Louis Freeh, Michael Lewis, Alex Rodriguez, Mark Ruffalo, and Lesley Stahl, was named a partner at UTA. GTN continued to operate from its offices in Florida and New York City.

The New York Observer named UTA one of "Hollywood's 7 Most Powerful Talent Agencies" in November 2017. In December, the agency also hosted Anita Hill at its offices during the early days of the Me Too movement, and provided support to the industry's Commission on Sexual Harassment and Advancing Equality in the Workplace, which Hill went on to lead. UTA became a founding donor of Time's Up in early 2018, committing $1 million to the organization against sexual harassment in the workplace in response to the Weinstein effect and Me Too movement. UTA acquired Circle Talent Agency, which focuses on dance and electronic music, in April 2018. In November 2020 UTA signed improv artist Kitboga, a leading content creator in the scambaiting space.

In 2019, UTA partnered with NBA agent Rich Paul to start a sports division. The untraditional move puts UTA in direct competition with Creative Artists Agency and William Morris Endeavor and provides instant notoriety to the company. Paul expanded the sports clients from 4 to 23 and in 2020 was asked to be on the company's board of directors. He was later named "Power Broker of the Year" by GQ Magazine.

In 2021, UTA continued its growth and diversification by acquiring strategic advisory firm MediaLink, launching an NFT practice, announcing a $200-million Special purpose acquisition company, IPO and opened a full-service office in Atlanta.

In June 2022, UTA acquired UK-based literary and talent agency Curtis Brown.

UTA Foundation 
The agency operates a non-profit organization called UTA Foundation. The foundation's annual week-long Project Impact has worked with various organizations and encourages employees to offer community service.

References

External links

 UTA Brand Studio

Talent and literary agencies
Privately held companies based in California
Companies based in Beverly Hills, California
American companies established in 1991
1991 establishments in California